Lion Dates Impex Pvt Ltd is India's largest date processing and trading company. The company has factories located in the city of Tiruchirapalli and nearby villages in India. The company also markets dates as a product to improve health. The company also manufactures honey, jam and oats. The Lion Dates brand is available across 29 states and 7 union territories in India.

Lion Dates is an ISO 9001:2008 company. The company adheres to principles of corporate social responsibility, and provides employment to rural women and employment to differently-abled people helping them gain socioeconomic mobility in society.

Today Lion Dates has close to a monopoly for dates in the Indian market.

Company affairs
The Lion Dates company is headed by Sri P. Ponnudurai, who has been conferred the best industrialist award from the Chief Minister of the State of Tamil Nadu on 15 August 2011. He was also presented this award for being the best private employer by providing maximum number of employment opportunities to the differently-abled persons.

Products
The products offered by Lion Dates are:
 Lion Dates deseeded.
 Lion Desert King dates.
 Lion Dates syrup.
 Lion Kashmir honey.
 Lion Oats.
 Lion Tamarind.
 Lion Jam Mixed fruit, Dates and Pineapple.
 Lion rose sharabat

References

External links
 Official website

Service companies of India